The 1977–78 Cleveland Cavaliers season was the eighth season of the franchise in the National Basketball Association (NBA).

Draft picks

Roster

Season standings

Notes
 z, y – division champions
 x – clinched playoff spot

Record vs. opponents

Game log

|-style="background:#fcc;"
| 3 || October 22, 1977 || @ Atlanta
| L 101–107
|
|
|
| The Omni7,894
| 1–2

|-style="background:#cfc;"
| 24 || December 10, 1977 || Atlanta
| W 102–87
|
|
|
| Coliseum at Richfield6,766
| 14–10

|-style="background:#cfc;"
| 42 || January 22, 1978 || Atlanta
| W 93–89
|
|
|
| Coliseum at Richfield10,585
| 21–21

|-style="background:#cfc;"
| 81 || April 7, 1978 || @ Atlanta
| W 111–109
|
|
|
| The Omni9,631
| 42–39

Playoffs

|- align="center" bgcolor="#ffcccc"
| 1
| April 12
| New York
| L 114–132
| Campy Russell (23)
| Elmore Smith (12)
| Foots Walker (6)
| Richfield Coliseum19,739
| 0–1
|- align="center" bgcolor="#ffcccc"
| 2
| April 14
| @ New York
| L 107–109
| Campy Russell (32)
| Campy Russell (8)
| Campy Russell (6)
| Madison Square Garden18,965
| 0–2
|-

References

Cleveland Cavaliers seasons
Cleveland
Cleveland
Cleveland